Nur Alam Ziku (26 October 1938– 21 February 2010) was a Jatiya Samajtantrik Dal-JSD politician and the former Member of Parliament of Kushtia-4. He was one of the founders of Jatiya Samajtantrik Dal.

Career
Ziku was elected to parliament from Kushtia-4 as a Jatiya Party candidate in 1988.

Death
Ziku died on 21 February 2010 in Shamarita Hospital, Dhaka, Bangladesh. His son, Syed Saimun Kanak, was also a politician of Jatiya Samajtantrik Dal (JSD).

References

Jatiya Samajtantrik Dal-JSD politicians
2010 deaths
4th Jatiya Sangsad members
1938 births